Rimmen railway halt is a railway halt, located a short distance north of the village of Nielstrup north of Frederikshavn in Vendsyssel, Denmark.

The halt is located on the Skagensbanen railway line from Skagen to Frederikshavn between Jerup station and Strandby station. The train services are currently operated by Nordjyske Jernbaner which run frequent local train services between Skagen station and Frederikshavn station.

History 
The halt opened in 1890 when the railway started. In 2008 the halt was renovated with a new platform and a new shelter.

See also 
 List of railway stations in Denmark

References

External links

 Nordjyske Jernbaner – Danish railway company operating in North Jutland Region
 Danske Jernbaner – website with information on railway history in Denmark
 Nordjyllands Jernbaner – website with information on railway history in North Jutland

Railway stations in the North Jutland Region
Railway stations opened in 1890
Railway stations in Denmark opened in the 19th century